Kamaka may refer to:
Kamaka (island), a small island in French Polynesia
Kamaka Ukulele
Kamakã languages, a small family of extinct Macro-Jê languages of Bahía near Brazil's Atlantic coast
Kamaka, a former gold town and railway station in New Zealand

People
Kai Kamaka III, American mixed martial artist
Kamakaimoku, Hawaiian chiefess in early 18th century
Kamaka Hepa, American college basketball player
Kamaka Kūkona, American musician
Kamaka Stillman, Hawaiian noble
McRonald Kamaka, also known as "King Kamaka", a professional wrestler with the ring name "Tor Kamata"